Carmen Luz "Carmín" Berríos Rivera is a Puerto Rican educator and politician. Has a BA in education from the Interamerican University of Puerto Rico and a Masters in administration and Supervision concentrated in psychology of the University of Phoenix. and a Masters in administration and Supervision concentrated in psychology of the University of Phoenix. She was a member of the Senate of Puerto Rico from 1997 to 2001. She is currently the President of the General Council for Education, the official authorized accrediting agency of the Government of Puerto Rico.

Berríos presented her candidacy to the Senate of Puerto Rico in 1996, to represent the District of Guayama. At the 1996 general elections, she won with 24.4% of the votes. In 2000, Berríos ran again for Senate, but lost to the candidates of the PPD.

References

Living people
Interamerican University of Puerto Rico alumni
Members of the Senate of Puerto Rico
Puerto Rican educators
People from Naranjito, Puerto Rico
20th-century Puerto Rican women politicians
20th-century Puerto Rican politicians
Year of birth missing (living people)
21st-century Puerto Rican women politicians
21st-century Puerto Rican politicians